Santa Maria de Tavira (or just Santa Maria)  is a former civil parish in the municipality of Tavira, Portugal. In 2013, the parish merged into the new parish Tavira (Santa Maria e Santiago). It was the main parish of the city of Tavira.

References

External links
 Santa Maria de Tavira parish website

Former parishes of Tavira